Haji Khuda Bux Rajar, is a Pakistani politician from Sanghar District, Sindh. He is also a Federal Minister of Pakistan appointed by President of Pakistan, Asif Ali Zardari in 2010. He is also a Member of National Assembly of Pakistan elected in Sanghar District.

References 

Living people
People from Sanghar District
Pakistan Muslim League politicians
Sindhi people
Year of birth missing (living people)